The men's +110 kg weightlifting competitions at the 1976 Summer Olympics in Montreal took place on 27 July at the St. Michel Arena. It was the second appearance of the super heavyweight class.

Results

References

Weightlifting at the 1976 Summer Olympics